The 2019 AFC Asian Cup was the 17th edition of the AFC Asian Cup, the quadrennial international men's football championship of Asia organised by the Asian Football Confederation (AFC). It was held in the United Arab Emirates from 5 January to 1 February 2019.

For the first time, the Asian Cup final tournament was contested by 24 teams, having been expanded from the 16-team format that was used from 2004 to 2015. Under this new format, the finalists would contest a group stage consisting of six groups of four teams, followed by a knockout stage of 16 teams. The host nation qualified for the final tournament automatically, while the remaining 23 places were determined among the other 45 national teams of the AFC through a qualifying competition running from 2015 to 2018, part of which also served as part of the 2018 FIFA World Cup qualification process for the confederation.

The tournament was won for the first time by Qatar, who defeated Japan 3–1 in the final. This was also Qatar's first ever top 4 finish in the competition. The defending champions (Australia), were eliminated by the hosts (UAE) at the quarter-finals, who subsequently lost to the eventual champions in the semi-finals.

Host selection

The bidding procedure and timeline for the 2019 AFC Asian Cup was approved at the AFC congress on 28 November 2012. The winning bid was originally set to be announced at an AFC congress in June, then November 2014. However, at its 60th Anniversary celebrations at the end of 2014, AFC gave the date of 'summer 2015' to when an announcement would be made.

In January 2015, AFC general secretary Alex Soosay said that Iran and the United Arab Emirates were the only two remaining bidders for the 2019 Asian Cup, and that the eventual hosts would be announced in March 2015.

On 9 March 2015, during an AFC Executive Committee meeting in Manama, Bahrain, the United Arab Emirates was announced as the host. This was the second time the country hosted the tournament, after the 1996 edition.

Teams

Qualification

The 2019 AFC Asian Cup qualification process determined the 24 participating teams for the tournament. In 2014, a proposal to merge the preliminary qualification rounds of the FIFA World Cup with those of the AFC Asian Cup was ratified by the AFC Competitions Committee. The new qualification structure took place in three stages, with the first two merging with the 2018 FIFA World Cup qualification In the first round, the lowest ranked teams played home-and-away over two legs to reduce the total number of teams to 40. In the second round, the 40 teams were divided into eight groups of five to play home-and-away round-robin matches, where the eight group winners and the four best group runners-up qualified for the 2019 AFC Asian Cup finals. In the third round, the next best 24 teams eliminated from second round were divided into six groups of four and competed for the remaining slots of the 2019 AFC Asian Cup. The first qualifying round of the qualification took place on 12 March 2015, and the final match of the third round took place on 27 March 2018.

Qualified teams
India, Syria, Thailand, and Turkmenistan qualified for the tournament after being absent in several Asian Cup tournaments spanning from 2004 to 2015. Lebanon and Vietnam both qualified for the first time after hosting the tournaments, in 2000 and 2007 respectively. For Vietnam, this was the first time they qualified for the AFC Asian Cup as a unified nation, having participated as South Vietnam in the first two editions (1956 and 1960), outside of hosting the 2007 edition. This was also the first time Yemen qualified for the AFC Asian Cup as a unified country, due to FIFA and AFC categorizing the participation of South Yemen in the 1976 as a distinct record not related to Yemen, who succeeded North Yemen. In addition to Yemen, Kyrgyzstan and the Philippines also marked this edition as their first times to qualify for an Asian Cup.

Iran qualified for the Asian Cup for the first time as a CAFA member, having qualified as part of the WAFF before. Afghanistan, along with its fellow CAFA member nation Tajikistan, were the only two countries from the Central Asian zone which failed to qualify for the tournament. Indonesia and Malaysia were the only co-hosts of the 2007 edition that did not qualify for the Asian Cup, as Indonesia was barred from entering the qualification due to tension inside the PSSI which led to FIFA suspension; while Malaysia had ended their campaign in disaster with just one point out of six matches. Kuwait was the only West Asian team not to qualify for the Asian Cup, as they were also barred from completing the qualification due to FIFA's sanction. India remained as the only South Asian team to qualify for the tournament. On 13 November 2018, the Asian Football Confederation warned the Iranian government to stop meddling in the country's football association, otherwise, it would have faced sanctions before the Asian Cup.

The following 24 teams qualified for the final tournament:

1 As South Vietnam
2 Yemen once qualified for the 1976 AFC Asian Cup as South Yemen, but according to FIFA and the AFC, the previous records of Yemen are registered as North Yemen instead.

Draw

The draw of the final tournament was held on 4 May 2018, 19:30 GST, at the Armani Hotel in the Burj Khalifa in Dubai. The FIFA rankings of April 2018 were used as basis for the seeding. The 12 teams that secured their place in the final tournament by the end of the second round of the qualification process were placed in Pots 1 and 2 while the remaining teams which qualified during the third round were allocated to the remaining pots. As hosts, the United Arab Emirates were seeded into Pot 1. The 24 teams were drawn into six groups of four teams, with the hosts placed in position A1. Four renowned Asian players: Ali Daei, Sun Jihai, Sunil Chhetri, and Phil Younghusband were chosen to draw the teams.

Draw result
Teams were drawn consecutively into Group A to F. Teams from each pot were assigned to the positions of their groups following by number orders of group stage, for example Pot 1 team were assigned to A1, and continued.

The draw resulted in the following groups:

Squads

Each team had to register a squad with a minimum of 18 players and a maximum of 23 players, at least three of whom must be goalkeepers.

Match officials

On 5 December 2018, the AFC announced the list of 30 referees, 30 assistant referees, two stand-by referees and two stand-by assistant referees, including one referee and two assistant referees from CONCACAF for the tournament. Video assistant referees (VAR) would be used from the quarter-finals onwards. In each match, the referee and his assistants were accompanied by two additional assistant referees stationed next to each team's goalpost.

Referees

  Chris Beath
  Peter Green
  Nawaf Shukralla
  Fu Ming
  Ma Ning
  Liu Kwok Man
  Alireza Faghani
  Ali Sabah
  Mohanad Qasim Sarray
  Jumpei Iida
  Hiroyuki Kimura
  Ryuji Sato
  Ahmed Faisal Al-Ali
  Adham Makhadmeh
  Kim Dong-jin
  Ko Hyung-jin
  Mohd Amirul Izwan Yaacob
  César Ramos
  Ahmed Al-Kaf
  Abdulrahman Al-Jassim
  Khamis Al-Kuwari
  Khamis Al-Marri
  Turki Al-Khudhayr
  Muhammad Taqi
  Hettikamkanamge Perera
  Ammar Al-Jeneibi
  Mohammed Abdulla Hassan Mohamed
  Ravshan Irmatov
  Valentin Kovalenko
  Ilgiz Tantashev

Assistant referees

  Matthew Cream
  Anton Shchetinin
  Mohamed Salman
  Yaser Tulefat
  Cao Yi
  Huo Weiming
  Mohammadreza Mansouri
  Reza Sokhandan
  Jun Mihara
  Hiroshi Yamauchi
  Mohammad Al-Kalaf
  Ahmad Al-Roalleh
  Park Sang-jun
  Yoon Kwang-yeol
  Sergei Grishchenko
  Mohd Yusri Muhamad
  Mohd Zainal Abidin
  Miguel Hernández
  Alberto Morín
  Abu Bakar Al-Amri
  Rashid Al-Ghaithi
  Saud Al-Maqaleh
  Taleb Al-Marri
  Mohammed Al-Bakri
  Ronnie Koh Min Kiat
  Palitha Hemathunga
  Mohamed Al-Hammadi
  Hasan Al-Mahri
  Abdukhamidullo Rasulov
  Jakhongir Saidov

Video assistant referees

  Paolo Valeri
  Danny Makkelie

Stand-by referees

  Nivon Robesh Gamini
  Hanna Hattab

Stand-by assistant referees

  Ali Ubaydee
  Priyanga Palliya Guruge

Venues
After being awarded the bid, initially the UAE chose six stadiums to host the tournament. The six stadiums were Zayed Sports City Stadium and Mohammed Bin Zayed Stadium in Abu Dhabi, Hazza Bin Zayed Stadium and Khalifa bin Zayed Stadium in Al Ain, and Dubai's Al Ahli Stadium and DSC Stadium. Later, two stadiums in Dubai were dropped due to financial problems and were replaced by Al Maktoum Stadium and Rashid Stadium, which were also located in Dubai.

After the 2015 Asian Cup, the AFC agreed to increase the number of teams from 16 to 24, following the UEFA Euro 2016. Hence, more stadiums were about to be chosen and rebuilt, in which Sharjah and Abu Dhabi won the rights to have more stadiums for the tournament. Sharjah Stadium and Al Nahyan Stadium were chosen aftermath, finalized the number of stadium to eight.

The eight venues used are Zayed Sports City Stadium, Mohammed Bin Zayed Stadium, and Al Nahyan Stadium in Abu Dhabi, Hazza Bin Zayed Stadium and Khalifa Bin Zayed Stadium in Al Ain, Al Maktoum Stadium and Rashid Stadium in Dubai, and Sharjah Stadium in Sharjah.

Format
The tournament was expanded to 24 teams from the previous format of 16 teams, which had been used since 2004. Only the hosts will receive an automatic qualification spot, while the other 23 teams will qualify through a qualification tournament. At the finals, the 24 teams will be drawn into six groups of four teams each. The teams in each group play a single round robin. After the group stage, the top two teams and the four best third teams will advance to the knockout stage, beginning with the round of 16. For the first time since a knockout stage was added to the competition in 1972, there will be no third place play-off.

Schedule

The AFC announced the official match schedule on 7 May 2018. Zayed Sports City Stadium, one of three stadiums in Abu Dhabi, staged both the opening match and the final. At least five matches were allocated to each venue, with every ground hosting at least one match in the knockout stage. The semi-finals were played on different days in Abu Dhabi and Dubai. No city hosted two matches on the same day – except in the final round of group stage matches when simultaneous kick-off is required.

Group stage
The top two teams of each group and the four best third-placed teams advanced to the round of 16.

All times are local, GST (UTC+4).

Tiebreakers
Teams were ranked according to points (3 points for a win, 1 point for a draw, 0 points for a loss), and if tied on points, the following tiebreaking criteria were applied, in the order given, to determine the rankings:
Points in head-to-head matches among tied teams;
Goal difference in head-to-head matches among tied teams;
Goals scored in head-to-head matches among tied teams;
If more than two teams were tied, and after applying all head-to-head criteria above, a subset of teams were still tied, all head-to-head criteria above were reapplied exclusively to this subset of teams;
Goal difference in all group matches;
Goals scored in all group matches;
Penalty shoot-out if only two teams were tied and they met in the last round of the group;
Disciplinary points (yellow card = 1 point, red card as a result of two yellow cards = 3 points, direct red card = 3 points, yellow card followed by direct red card = 4 points);
Drawing of lots.

Group A

Group A saw the opening match of the tournament which was a one-all draw between United Arab Emirates and Bahrain, with Ahmed Khalil getting the equaliser in the 88th minute after going one goal down only ten minutes prior. UAE and Thailand qualified as the top two nations in the group after a 1–1 draw at the Hazza bin Zayed Stadium, and Bahrain qualified in third place after a 1–0 win over India. India finished last in the group after they recorded their first win in the Asian Cup for 55 years over Thailand in their opening match, before losing their remaining two games.

Group B

Group B saw Jordan qualify on top of the group after defeating the defending champions in the opening match from an Anas Bani Yaseen header. This was followed up by a 2–0 win over Syria which saw Syrian manager Bernd Stange sacked after the match and being replaced by Fajr Ibrahim. Joining them in the round of 16 was Australia, who after losing to Jordan in their opening match, got two wins over Palestine and Syria with that match only being won by a goal from Tom Rogic in injury time.

Group C

Group C saw South Korea and China qualify through as the top two seeds with the game between the two matches seeing South Korea on top of the group after a 2–0 win. This meant that South Korea finished without conceding a goal after previously getting two 1–0 wins over the Philippines and Kyrgyzstan. In the battle for third place, it was between two newcomers to the competition, with Kyrgyzstan getting their first win in an Asian competition with a hat-trick from Vitalij Lux, securing a 3–1 win for the central Asian team despite a late consolation goal from Stephan Schröck, which was the first Philippine goal in the tournament.

Group D

Group D saw Iran and Iraq both qualify through to the round of 16 as the top two teams after both finished the group with seven points following their match finishing in a 0–0 draw at the Al Maktoum Stadium. Iran finished top of the group on goal difference, largely in part to their 5–0 defeat of debutantes Yemen in their first game, which included a double from Mehdi Taremi. A 2–0 win over Vietnam saw the team go through with three clean sheets from three. Iraq had a tougher game in their opener against Vietnam, with only a late 90th-minute goal from Ali Adnan securing them three points. This would later be followed with a 3–0 win over Yemen to qualify with Iran, with Vietnam qualifying in third place after a 2–0 victory over Yemen.

Group E

Group E witnessed Qatar and Saudi Arabia qualify for the round of 16. In the decisive match for first place, Qatar beat Saudi Arabia 2–0, thanks to a brace by Almoez Ali. Qatar began their campaign with a comfortable, albeit controversial, 2–0 win over Lebanon, before beating North Korea 6–0, sealing their place in the knockout stage. Ali was decisive in both games, scoring a goal against Lebanon, and four goals against North Korea. Meanwhile, Saudi Arabia opened their account with a 4–0 win over North Korea, before booking a place to the next round by beating Lebanon 2–0. In their last fixture, Lebanon beat North Korea 4–1 with a Hilal El-Helwe brace; the win was Lebanon's first in the competition. However, Lebanon missed out on the next round on fair play points.

Group F

Group F saw Japan and Uzbekistan progressing to the round of 16, with Japan defeating Uzbekistan 2–1 to finish in first place. Japan began their campaign with a 3–2 victory over Turkmenistan, before beating Oman 1–0 to qualify for the knockout stage. Uzbekistan, on the other hand, beat Oman 2–1 thanks to an 85th-minute goal by Eldor Shomurodov, before beating their neighbors Turkmenistan 4–0. Oman qualified for the next round for the first time, after winning 3–1 over Turkmenistan, with Mohammed Al-Musalami scoring a goal in the injury time.

Ranking of third-placed teams

Knockout stage

In the knockout stage, extra time and penalty shoot-out were used to decide the winner if necessary. A fourth substitution could be made during extra time.

Bracket

Round of 16

Quarter-finals

Semi-finals

Final

Statistics

Goalscorers

Discipline
A player was automatically suspended for the next match for the following offences:
 Receiving a red card (red card suspensions may be extended for serious offences)
 Receiving two yellow cards in two matches; yellow cards expire after the completion of the quarter-finals (yellow card suspensions are not carried forward to any other future international matches)
The following suspensions were served during the tournament:

Awards
Most Valuable Player
 Almoez Ali
Top Goalscorer
 Almoez Ali
Best Goalkeeper
 Saad Al-Sheeb
Fair Play Award

Team of the tournament
According to the AFC organization committee, eight players from the winning Qatari team and five players from the runner-up Japanese team were selected in the team of the tournament. Six players from teams which progressed to the semi-finals (Iran and the United Arab Emirates) were also selected. In addition, four players from teams which progressed to the quarter-finals were selected.

Marketing

Logo and slogan
The official logo of the 2019 AFC Asian Cup was unveiled on 23 January 2017 in Abu Dhabi during the drawing ceremony for the third round of the 2019 AFC Asian Cup qualification. The colors used in the logo were derived from the flag of the UAE. The seven hexagons formed by colored ribbons represents the seven emirates of the host country. The interlacing hexagon pattern of the logo was inspired from Islamic art, as well as the old Emirati tradition of using palm leaves, locally known as saf, in weaving. The outer circle along with the geometric design within it symbolizes the sport of football.

The slogan, "Bringing Asia Together", was unveiled on 5 January 2018, a year before the tournament's kick-off.

Match ball

The official match ball, the Molten Acentec, was made by Molten Corporation.

Mascots
During the final draw on 4 May 2018, two mascots, Mansour and Jarrah, were unveiled. The falcon is an important symbol of the Arab world and also features on the emblem of the United Arab Emirates.

Song
Theme song was Zanaha Zayed by Hussain Al Jassmi, Balqees Ahmed Fathi and Eida Al Menhali.

Trophy
Also on the drawing day on 4 May 2018, a new trophy made by Thomas Lyte was unveiled. It is 78 centimetres tall, 42 centimetres wide and weighs 15 kilograms of silver. The trophy is modeled over the lotus flower, a symbolic flower of Asia. The five petals of the lotus symbolise the five sub-confederations under the AFC. The winning teams' names are engraved around the trophy base, which is separable from the trophy's main body.

Prize money
Total prize money pool for the tournament was US$14,800,000. The champions would receive US$5 million, the runners-up will receive US$3 million, and the losing semi-finalists would receive US$1 million. All 24 participating teams would also receive US$200,000.

Team bus slogans
The tournament organizers held a competition where fans got to choose and vote on slogans to be used on the team buses of the 24 participating national teams.

Broadcasting
The tournament was broadcast live by around 80 TV channels covering the whole world. 800 million people were expected to watch matches, with the tournament reaching a potential TV audience of more than 2.5 billion people.

ESPN5 made a "competitive bid" to broadcast the tournament on free-to-air television in the Philippines, but it was not accepted by the AFC.

In the Middle East, where Qatar-based BeIN Sports has rights to broadcast the Asian Cup in the region, BeoutQ (allegedly backed by Saudi Arabia) also illegally broadcast the tournament as part of a proxy conflict in a diplomatic crisis between Qatar and various Arab states. The AFC has noted BeoutQ's broadcast and condemned it for "persistent and illegal screening".

For the first time since the expulsion of Israel from the Asian Football Confederation, the UAE allowed Israeli TV channel Sport 5 to directly broadcast the tournament. This was seen as a sign of warming relations between Israel and the UAE. Sport 5 officially broadcast the opening match between the UAE and Bahrain, and had remained active until the end of the tournament. A year later in the following tournament, Israel and the United Arab Emirates officially normalised relations.

At the end of the tournament, AFC announced that the 2019 Asian Cup was the most engaging in history across all social platforms reaching 169.4 million impressions, an increase by more than fifteen times from the 11 million reach from 2015 AFC Asian Cup.

Broadcast rights are sold by Lagardère Sports on behalf of the AFC.

Controversies

Australia vs. Palestine
Many ticket-holding fans were locked out of the Group B match between Palestine and Australia, with management closing a number of Rashid Stadium gates before the start of the match “in the interests of fan safety”. Rashid Stadium was one of the smallest stadiums in the tournament with only 12,000 seats and many non-ticket holding fans attempted to watch the match without buying tickets. The organizing committee issued a statement for the reasons of closure stating “Ahead of kick-off a large crowd of fans with and without tickets had gathered over a short period of time outside the stadium, which resulted in the need to secure the area." They then issued an apology to supporters who were “inconvenienced or left disappointed” and issued an investigative probe to insure it to be an isolated incident.

Qatar travel complications
As a result of Qatar diplomatic crisis between Qatar and number of its neighbours since 5 June 2017, including the United Arab Emirates as the host country, the UAE suspended all direct flights between the two countries and initially banned Qatari citizens from entering their country, although the Emirati government later announced that it would permit Qatari citizens temporary entry into the country pending approval from Emirati authorities. According to a report, Saoud al-Mohannadi, a Qatari national who is the AFC vice-president and chairman of the organizing committee for the Asian Cup, was unable to enter the UAE two days prior to the tournament's start because Emirati authorities had not yet cleared him. The director of the 2019 AFC Organizing Committee denied reports that Al Mohannadi was refused entry and declared that Al Mohannadi has arrived on Friday morning and was preparing for his meetings. The director stated that there was no evidence that shows he was unable to enter and stated that this news has "political purposes". He stated "We try to keep sports away from politics."

The diplomatic crisis prevented many fans from attending Qatar matches in the UAE. This had affected attendance figures in Qatar matches, as little more than 450 people spectated the Group E clash between North Korea and Qatar on 13 January. The UAE government had confirmed previously that Qatari citizens may enter UAE with prior permission obtained directly through a hotline from UAE authorities.

According to Qatar's Sports Press Committee, five Qatar-based media representatives were denied entry into the UAE despite having entry visas and receiving assurances that they would be allowed to attend and report on the tournament by the AFC. The AFC Media Committee dismissed the Qatari reports and stated that some of the Qatar-based journalists confused visit visas with work visas and advised all journalists to contact them if they encounter any issues with the entry visa type.

According to Al Jazeera, the final match, which was won by Qatar, was played "almost entirely without" Qatari support from the stands, due to the travel ban. However, according to Qatar-based The Peninsula large number of Omani fans supported the Qatari team in the stadium, stating "The large number of fans who supported the Qatari team were wearing the logo of Al Annabi [The Maroons] with the background of the names of various players. Apart from their attendance, they carried flags in the stadium and continued to cheer for Al Annabi [The Maroons] players and sing songs throughout the game."

Footwear-throwing incident
During the semi-final match between Qatar and hosts United Arab Emirates, some UAE supporters threw bottles and footwear into the match after Qatari players scored their second goal; the latter is considered to be highly offensive in the Middle East. One of the Qatari players, Salem Al Hajri, was struck on the head with a shoe after Qatar scored its third goal. This conduct was preceded by booing the Qatari national anthem. The two countries had had a hostile relationship and had cut diplomatic ties due to the ongoing diplomatic crisis. Qatar won 4–0 despite the events, reaching their first Asian Cup final. Afterwards, the AFC declared that it would conduct an investigation into the proceedings.

Qatar player eligibility
On 30 January 2019, soon after the hosts lost to Qatar in the semi-finals, the United Arab Emirates Football Association lodged a formal appeal to the AFC over the eligibility of Sudanese-born Almoez Ali and Iraqi-born Bassam Al-Rawi, claiming that they did not qualify to play for Qatar on residency grounds per Article 7 of the Regulations Governing the Application of the FIFA statutes, which states a player is eligible to play for a representative team if he has "lived continuously for at least five years after reaching the age of 18 on the territory of the relevant association". It was alleged that Ali and Al-Rawi had not lived continuously in Qatar for at least five years over the age of 18, although the players claimed that their mothers were born in Qatar.

Only hours prior to the start of the final on 1 February 2019, the AFC Disciplinary and Ethics Committee announced that it had dismissed the protest lodged by the UAEFA.

Qatar football shirt fan incident
A British-Sudanese football fan claimed that he was beaten and arrested for wearing a Qatari shirt to a match in which Qatar were playing and then, after reporting to the police, arrested and accused of wasting police time and making false statements of being assaulted. In an interview with Sky News, he claimed he was beaten, starved, and deprived of sleep by the police for wearing a Qatar shirt. The fan claims were denied by UAE authorities who stated that he was arrested for wasting police time and making false assault claims to the police. 
"The police took him to hospital where a doctor who examined him concluded that his injuries were inconsistent with his account of events and appeared to be self-inflicted,"
 The government said.
The police claimed that the fan had admitted to making false statements and his offense will be processed through the courts. An official in the UAE embassy in London stated “He was categorically not arrested for wearing a Qatar football shirt. This is instead an instance of a person seeking media attention and wasting police time.”

References

External links

, the-AFC.com
AFC Asian Cup UAE 2019, stats.the-AFC.com

 
2019
Afc Asian Cup
Afc Asian Cup
2019 AFC Asian Cup
Afc Asian Cup
Afc Asian Cup